was a Japanese samurai of the Sengoku period through early Edo period, who served the Ukita clan(Ukita Naoie and Ukita Hideie) as a senior retainer. He was the castle lord in command of Mushiage Castle.

References

Samurai
1524 births
1605 deaths
Ukita clan